Stephen Speaks is an American acoustic rock/indie pop band project of singer-songwriter Rockwell Ryan Ripperger. The band was initially founded by Ripperger and TJ McCloud in 1999 as a duo.

Ripperger released Stephen Speaks' debut album, No More Doubt, independently in September 2001. No More Doubt was certified platinum by Warner Music Philippines in 2003.

In January 2018, the single Walk On, from Stephen Speaks' fourth scheduled studio album, Alive To Fight, was released.

History
Stephen Speaks' first studio album, No More Doubt, was recorded in 2000. Upon release in 2001, Passenger Seat and Out of My League received significant airplay atop Filipino pop radio stations. No More Doubt was released in the Philippines on February 4, 2003, through Warner Music and Rippley Records, and declared platinum ten days later on February 14, 2003.

Stephen Speaks' second album was recorded in Ripperger's home studio in 2003. The Leaving Song featured Grammy-nominated artist Ryan Tedder on vocals. Ripperger briefly performed under his real name "Rockwell Ryan" before reverting to Stephen Speaks in 2004. Ripperger usually performs along with his brother Dain Samuelson who plays percussion for him. In 2005, Ripperger digitally produced One More Day for exclusive release on iTunes. Ripperger worked with producer Chad Copelin to release Symptoms of Love on January 7, 2008.

In December 2010, Stephen Speaks released Christmas With Friends 2 for free on the band's website. The album featured vocalists Lindsey Sandella, Ben Kilgore, Noelle Kilgore, Julia Frej, and Jay Lashley, and guitarists Jesse Aycock, Jeff Coleman, Matt Cox, and Ben Mosier.

Stephen Speaks' third studio album, Age of the Underdog, was recorded in the summer of 2010 with producer and drummer Brady Blade. The album was released in 2011 alongside a documentary of the recordings.

Discography

Studio albums
 No More Doubt (2001)
 Symptoms of Love (2008)
 Age of the Underdog (2011)
 Alive To Fight (2018 exp.)

Extended plays
 Doubting Thomas (1999)
 No More Doubt (2000)
 One More Day (2003)

Compilations
 Christmas With Friends (2009)
 Christmas With Friends 2 (2010)
 Christmas With Friends 3 (2011)

Personnel
Former member
TJ McCloud (vocals, guitar)

Touring/session members
Current
Dain Samuelson (percussion)

Former
Amber Sturges (vocals)
Blake Howard (bass guitar)
Blake Farmer (drums)

References

External links

Musical groups from Oklahoma
Indie pop groups
American pop rock music groups
American post-grunge musical groups